Marianne Mewes is a retired East German rower who won two gold, two silver medal and two bronze medals at the European championships between 1960 and 1966.

References

Year of birth missing (living people)
Living people
East German female rowers
European Rowing Championships medalists